Rosemont, also known as Taylor's Seat and Hardscrabble, is a historic home located near Powhatan, Powhatan County, Virginia. It was built in 1898, and is a -story, frame dwelling in the Queen Anne / Stick Style.  It features Gothic Revival detailing, varying window types, stained glass, wainscoting and a plethora of fireplaces.  Also on the property are the contributing original frame stable and cemetery.

It was added to the National Register of Historic Places in 2008.

References

Houses on the National Register of Historic Places in Virginia
Queen Anne architecture in Virginia
Houses completed in 1898
Houses in Powhatan County, Virginia
National Register of Historic Places in Powhatan County, Virginia